The Rubis was a French two-stage rocket. It used an Agate for its first stage and a P064 engine for its second stage. The Rubis was launched eleven times from 10 June 1964 to 5 July 1967. All Rubis rockets were launched from CIEES at Hammaguir, French Algeria, with the exception of the last launch, which took place from Biscarosse. It was used to test technologies used in the Diamant, France's first orbital rocket, as well as to launch scientific instruments from the Paris Observatory and Max Planck Institute.

References

Rockets and missiles
Space launch vehicles of France